Daniel Montgomery Jr. (October 30, 1765December 30, 1831) was an American pioneer, soldier, and public servant.

Biography 
Daniel Montgomery Jr. was the third son of William Montgomery, and was fifteen years old when his father settled his lands in Northumberland County in Pennsylvania called "Montgomery's Landing" and later Danville, named after Daniel. Under the guidance and assistance of his father, he opened the first store in Danville. Soon he was the trusted merchant and factor of a wide circle of patrons. This first store building was where General William Montgomery House now stands. On November 27, 1791, Daniel Montgomery married Christiana Strawbridge. The next year he laid out the town of Danville — the part east of Mill street. The new town received its baptismal name from the abbreviation of his Christian name, through the partiality of his customers. From this time until his death he was the most prominent man in this part of the State. Elected to the Legislature in 1802, he at once took his father's place as a trusted leader in the public enterprises and politics of his district. By leading men throughout the State he was recognized as a man of great influence in wisely shaping public affairs. During his active political life of many years he carried on his extensive mercantile establishment, purchased and owned large tracts of land. In 1805 he was lieutenant-colonel in the 81st Pennsylvania Militia. He was appointed major-general of the 9th Division July 27, 1809. He was the chief promoter in the building of turnpike roads in this portion of the State. Elected to Congress in 1807 as a Democrat, he served out his term ably and acceptably and declined a reelection. He worked efficiently for the division of Northumberland county and the erection of Columbia and Union counties; Danville was made the county seat of Columbia county, and the father and son donated the land for the county buildings, and contributed largely in money towards their erection. In 1823, though strongly urged by prominent men all over the State, he declined to stand for the office of governor. In 1828 he was appointed one of the canal commissioners, and it was while he was in this office that the great internal State improvements were inaugurated — among others the North Branch canal was located and well advanced towards completion. He was a large stockholder and a strong promoter of the Danville Bridge Company, completing the bridge in 1829. He originated the project of the Danville & Pottsville railroad and was first president of the company.

Further reading 
 Russel, A.F. In memory of Gen'l William Montgomery, Gen'l Daniel Montgomery, and John C. Boyd. Intelligencer (1879)
 Brower, D.H.B. Danville, A Collection of Historical and Biographical Sketches. Lane S. Hart. (1881)

References

1765 births
1831 deaths
Members of the Pennsylvania House of Representatives
Pennsylvania state senators
People from Chester County, Pennsylvania
People from Danville, Pennsylvania
Democratic-Republican Party members of the United States House of Representatives from Pennsylvania